Real Santander is a professional Colombian football team based in Bucaramanga, that currently plays in the Categoría Primera B. They play their home games at the Estadio Villa Concha in Piedecuesta, a municipality in the metropolitan area of Bucaramanga.

History
The club was founded on 17 January 2006 in Floridablanca, Santander Department after the demise of Real Floridablanca eight years earlier. In late 2006 they acquired the license (ficha) of Pumas de Casanare and became affiliated to DIMAYOR, entering Categoría Primera B, Colombia's second tier in 2007. The club's best achievement in Primera B was a runner-up finish in the first tournament of the 2017 Categoría Primera B season, losing the double-legged final to Boyacá Chicó.

Relocation to San Andrés Island
Financial difficulties at their hometown forced the club to relocate the men's team to the Caribbean island of San Andrés in late 2018, being renamed as Real San Andrés and playing their home matches at Erwin O'Neil Stadium, becoming the first professional team from the islands, while their youth and women's teams remained behind in Floridablanca. In their first tournament after the relocation, the 2019 Apertura, they ended in 14th place.

Return to Santander
Due to the COVID-19 pandemic and the multiple logistical drawbacks stemming from it ranging from lack of transportation to the islands to games behind closed doors and potentially scarce financial support from the local government, the agreement with the San Andrés and Providencia authorities was not renewed at the end of the 2020 season, and the men's team returned to the Santander Department for the 2021 Primera B season. Having been refused the use of Estadio Alfonso López in Bucaramanga by its main tenant Atlético Bucaramanga, they played their first games of the season at Estadio Daniel Villa Zapata in Barrancabermeja until the completion of the adaptation works of Estadio Villa Concha in Piedecuesta.

Current squad

References

Football clubs in Colombia
Association football clubs established in 2002
2002 establishments in Colombia
Categoría Primera B clubs